Charlotte Elizabeth Vega (born 10 February 1994 in Madrid) is a Spanish-British actress and model, known for her role in the 2014 Spanish film The Misfits Club, the lead role in the 2017 Irish film The Lodgers, and main roles in two television series during 2015: season 3 of the Spanish series Velvet and the single season of the Spanish-British co-production The Refugees. She also plays the lead role in the 2021 film  Wrong Turn.

Early life
Charlotte Vega was born in Madrid and raised in London. Her parents are both British-born, although her paternal grandparents were from Andalusia. As a child, her father spoke Spanish to Charlotte and her brother, while her mother spoke English. When asked about her background, she said in a 2018 interview: "I feel very Spanish at times and then other times I’ll feel very British. Sometimes Spanish people can be very touchy and overly friendly and I can feel a bit more distant. Other times, I’ll be with British people and think, oh they’re very cold and distant and need some more Spanish in them!”

After enjoying improv classes, she left equestrian school at age 17 to focus on her acting career.

Filmography

Film

Television

References

External links
 

British people of Spanish descent
Spanish people of English descent
Spanish television actresses
Living people
1994 births
21st-century Spanish actresses
Actresses from Madrid
People of Andalusian descent